The Étoile Sportive du Sahel, is a sports club from Sousse in the Sahel region of Tunisia, known primarily for its football and basketball team. The club also has sections for handball, volleyball, judo and wrestling. ESS was founded on 11 May 1925 after a general meeting under the chairmanship of Chedly Boujemla, Ali Laârbi and Ahmed Zaklaoui, at the headquarters of the Association of the ancient French-Arab School in Laroussi Zarouk Street, in the heart of the old town of Sousse. The aim of the meeting was to establish a sports education society. The Tunisian flag was chosen in the selection of the colors of the team. The red shirt with the star and the white shorts. The French colonial authorities prevented the use of these colors, but with the insistence of the team leaders they prevailed and in the latter they played this kit. In English the name means Sport (or Athletic) Star of the Sahel (coast)

In Tunisia, Étoile du Sahel is considered to be one of the best clubs. For many years it had a reputation of playing entertaining football. In fact, the club has evolved recently into a more professional outfit capable of winning trophies at home and abroad. Since 1950, ESS has been crowned domestic champions on ten occasions.

On the continental side, Étoile du Sahel has won more CAF trophies than any other Tunisian team. The club has 1 CAF Champions League, 2 CAF Super Cup titles, 2 CAF Confederation Cup titles and 2 African Cup Winners' Cup. ESS was listed as one of the most valuable football clubs in Africa and one of the most widely supported teams in the continent.

Internationally, Étoile du Sahel was the first Tunisian club to participate in the FIFA Club World Cup. They competed in the fifth edition that took place in 2007 in Japan. The club became the second club to reach the FIFA Club World semi-final as the representative of CAF, after Al Ahly SC in 2006, as they defeated Pachuca CF at the quarter-final of 2007 FIFA Club World Cup.

History

Beginnings (1925–1931)

The club was founded during a public meeting at the French-Tunisian school on Laroussi Zarrouk Street, in Sousse. Chedli Boujemla was elected as the first chairman of the multi-sport club.  La Soussienne and La Musulmane ("The Muslim") were rejected as club names in favor of L'Étoile Sportive. Club members eventually settled on L'Étoile Sportive du Sahel to reflect the goal of representing a broader region than Sousse alone. The Protectorate administration officially recognized the club on 17 July 1925. In March 1926, Ali Larbi became chairman of the soccer section of the club, which entered the Tunisian Football Federation.

Its first team members were Mohamed Bouraoui, Abdelkader Ben Amor, Abdelhamid Baddaï, Sadok Zmentar, Ali Guermachi, Mohamed Mtir, Benaïssa Hicheri, Béchir Dardour et Tahar Kenani.

In March 1926, Ali Laarbi became president of the football section affiliated to the Tunisian Football League (number 4922).
After a year of running in which the club played friendly matches, it enters the Honor Promotion Division Center, which corresponds to the second division ranked under the South-South Division of Honor, which awards the title of regional champion.

ESS played in the final of the national championship against the North Champion.
The lineup was: Mohamed Bouraoui, Abdelkader Ben Amor, Abdelhamid Baddai, Sadok Zmentar, Sadok Chalouat, Ali Guermachi, Mohamed Mtir, Benaïssa Hicheri, Bashir Dardour and Tahar Kenani.

The club played the leading roles and matured in 1930–1931, where it won the regional championship and then played against the champions of the Southwest (La Gafsienne) and the South (Club Sportif Gabesien). He entered the honor division to no longer experience a lower division demotion.

Stability and improvement (1931–1939)

On 25 June 1931, the club held its general meeting early enough to prepare the new season. The elected committee is composed of:

 Ali Laâdhari (President)
 Abderrahman Limam and Mustapha Ghachem (vice-president)
 Salah Baddaï (Secretary General)
 Bouraoui Nabli (Assistant Secretary)
 Mohamed Letaïef (treasurer)
 Hassine Kamoun (Assistant Treasurer)
 Ahmed Mlayeh and Salem Ben Hmida (members)

Abdelhamid Baddai is appointed coach. With young Habib Sayeh, Mustapha Ksia, Bouraoui Gnaba and Abdessalem Saad joining in quickly, the club won the district championship by scoring 31 goals in fourteen games and conceding ten goals. But it fails at the national level against the Italia, champion of the North (1–3 with a goal of Bashir Dardour and 2–4 with goals of Sadok Zmentar and Bashir Dardour), after leading 2–0 in the middle. time.

In 1934, he hired for the first time a qualified coach, the first Tunisian to obtain the license of the French Football Federation, Mohamed Boudhina, former coach of Esperance Sports Tunis and former player of FC Metz and AS Nancy. The team improves and reaches the semi-finals of the Tunisian Football Cup in 1937 and the final in 1939.

The Ligue de Tunisie de Football Association (LTFA) which was a Tunisian body affiliated to the French Football Federation has organized the national competitions during this period of the French protectorate of Tunisia.

Disruptions (1940–1946)
The outbreak of the Second World War disrupts sports activity: the team plays against El Makarem de Mahdia and the Patriote de Sousse in 1941 and a lost final of a Center-South region against the CS Gabèsien in 1942. This period saw the confirmation of great players like , Habib Mougou, Sadok Soussi, Abdallah Ghomrasni, Abdelhamid Blal and Aleya Douik. The halting of competitions in the region leads to join the ranks of Grombalia Sports. The team resumed its activity in 1946: they  won the Center-South championship but failed against the CA Bizertin in the national final and also lost the final of the Tunisian Cup against the other club of Bizerte, the Patrie Football Club bizertin.

Privileged position at the national level (1947–1955)
From 1946 to 1947, the Tunisian football championship was organized at the national level. The team that has never left the national division that called "Division of Excellence".
In 1947, the team settled in fourth place in the local league in addition to the early exit of the cup from the round of 16 against the US Béja and Habib Mougou scored 13 goals to be the scorer of the team followed by Hamed Douik with 6 goals.

In the following year, ES Sahel maintained the same position in the league and was defeated in the Cup against Patrie Football Club bizertin in the semi-final. Mougou was the team's top scorer for the second year in a row with 11 goals

In 1949 the team advanced and a finished second in the tournament and Habib Mougou was again a scorer with 10 goals and withdrew from the cup in the quarter-finals against the CS Hammam-Lif.

The team waited until 1950 to win their first league title, and Habib Mougou was the national league's top scorer with 20 goals, but he lost the cup final to CS Hammam-Lif again. ESS's first major honour was the Tunisian Ligue Professionnelle 1 title in 1950, but they had to wait 8 years to pick it up again.

In the year that followed this season, the team finished sixth in the championship, as was Bechir Jerbi, the team's top scorer, ending the domination of Mogou, in addition to the exit from the quarter-final against CS Hammam-Lif for the third year.

The tournament was interrupted in 1952 because of the political events and the demands for Tunisia's independence from France. This did not prevent the end of the cup competition in which ES Sahel lost to ES Tunis in the quarter-final.

The tournament came back two years later and the team finished in fourth place and Habib Mougou scored 11 goals and the team lost in the cup against CS Hammam-Lif in the final.

In the following year, the team was in the same position finished us the fact that he was defeated in the cup against the same team but from the quarter-finals. Habib also finished the season with 12 goals.

They also reached the quarter-finals of the North African Cup in 1950 by eliminating the Racing de Casablanca, the oldest Moroccan clubs still active.

Post-independence and dissolution (1956–1961)
After the independence of the country, the club stands out as one of the best teams, often oscillating between first and third place. He played four successive finals of the Tunisian Cup but won only one, and won the championship in 1958.
They won their first Tunisian President Cup in 1959, and completed a league and cup double in 1963 – becoming one of the first Tunisian teams to do so.

The team settled in the second place of the Tunisian league which was organized by the Tunisian Football Federation after being organized by the French Football Federation. Habib Mougou has scored 25 goals to be the scorer of the championship, despite not winning the title of how they lost to Club Africain in the Tunisian Cup in the quarterfinals 3–0.
In the following year, the team signed with coach George Berry to be the first English coach of the team and the team could get third place in the championship and reached the final of the cup before losing to Espérance de Tunis 2–1. Mougou finished the season as a scorer for his team with 16 goals.

Berry remained in charge for the season, where ES Sahel won the league title and reached the Tunisian Cup final before losing to Stade Tunisien 2–0. Mougou finished the season as scorer with 28 goals in the league with Boubaker Haddad of the CA Bizertin.
In 1959, the team finished second in the local league, but won the Tunisian Cup for the first time in their history after beating ES Tunis in the final 3–2 and Mougou "the historic scorer of the team" scored 14 goals.

In 1960, the team's level dropped as they finished at the seventh place in the league and was defeated in the Cup final against Stade Tunisien 2–0 and Mougou ended the season with 5 goals. This period saw the emergence of new players competing with Habib Mougou on top scorer of the season with the team such as Abdelmajid Chetali and Ali Chaouach.

The 1961 season was catastrophic for ES Sahel after being defeated  in the Cup from the quarter-final against Esperance 2–0 and the team which was in third place and competing for the title until the round 17 before being dissolved.

His rivalry with Esperance sportive de Tunis unleashes passions and excesses occur after a match lost in the quarterfinals of the Cup in 1961, against the rival of always (0–2). The national authorities then decide to dissolve the club; the youth and sports directorate issued a statement indicating that the President of the Republic received, on 20 March at 5 pm, at his home in Monastir, the steering committee to inform his members of his deep dissatisfaction: that the incidents which occurred during the match in question are likely to feed the animosity and the hatred in the hearts of the young people and to sow discord among them [...] As these incidents reached a such as the safety of citizens may be in danger, as the leaders of the association in question have not lived up to their duty and to bring all football officials in Tunisia to meditate on in this example, the President of the Republic has decided – in addition to ongoing legal proceedings – to dissolve the association of the Etoile Sportive du Sahel and to suspend its leaders and players.

Outstanding results (1962–1978)

Back, after a year of dissolution, it is a period of ostentation during which the club wins many titles at the national and Maghreb. It adopts a style combining the game of attack and the technique to efficiency. Two figures symbolize this period: President Hamed Karoui (1961–1981) and Abdelmajid Chetali, player until 1970 then coach (1971–1978).

The team's return to the competition was accompanied by the arrival of Yugoslavian coach Božidar Drenovac and was able to win the league title and the Tunisian Cup after beating Club Africain 2–1 to achieve the first-ever double for the team.
This period was also known as the retirement of legend Habib Moqou after great seasons with his team and Raouf Ben Amor finished the season as a scorer for his team with 8 goals.
In the next season, the team finished the season in sixth place and defeated them in the quarter-finals of the Cup against Stade Tunisien in the quarter-finals 2–0, and Ben Amor finished the season as the scorer of his team again with 10 goals.
Drenovac continued to lead the team to 1965 where they finished third in the league but withdrew from the cup early after the sudden defeat to AS Marsa 1–0 to end the five-year-old Yugoslav coach and Ben Amar finished the season as a scorer with his team for the third time with 12 goals.

The team management continued to recruit foreign coaches to coach Soviet coach Aleksei Paramonov, who managed to win the local league. Habib Akid and Salem Kedadi scored 17 goals as the team's top scorers, but the team lost their quarter-final in the Cup to the future of the game again. .
In the following year, the team finished second in the tournament and was defeated in the Cup final against Club Africain 2–0, which contributed to the departure of coach Paramonov and Salem Kedadi was the team's top scorer with 7 goals.
The next period was characterized by instability in the coaches by the arrival of Hungarian coach Harzeg where the team finished season in fourth place and withdrew from the cup against Club Africain 1–0 in the round of 32.
Former players Bechir Jerbi and Habib Mougou also coached the team in 1969 but the team finished the season in fifth place and came out early in the cup competition against Stade Sportif Sfaxien.
Yugoslav coach Dorinovac returned to lead the team, finishing third in the competition and out of the Tunisian Cup against AS Marsa 3–2. Othman Jenayah finished the season as a scorer of the Tunisian league with 15 goals, leaving a good impression.

In 1970, the club appointed the club's son Abdelmajid Chetali to lead the team and finished the season in fourth place and reached the final of the Cup that was won by Esperance. Abdesselam Adhouma made a respectable season by finishing the season with 17 goals as the scorer of the league.
The team improved and the management renewed confidence in the young coach. He won in the year following the league title and Adhouma ended the season with nine goals, but the team came out of the cup in the quarter-finals against Club Africain 1–0.
In 1973, ES Sahel entered the regional competition and won the Maghreb Champions Cup for the first time in his history after beating Algeria's club CR Belouizdad 2–0. He also won the Tunisian Super Cup for the first time after a 5–2 win over Club Africain. This year was not successful locally after being second in the championship and defeat in the quarter-finals of the Cup against Stade Tunisien 1–0 and have scored both Abdessalem Adhouma and Slah Karoui 8 goals.
In 1974 the team finished the season in third place locally despite the season of Adhouma as a scorer of the league with 16 goals. He also won the trophy for the third time by beating Club Africain 1–0. The team also took part in the Maghreb Champions Cup and reached third place after defeating JS Kabylie in the semi-finals on penalties and beating Morocco's KAC Kénitra in third place match 1–0.

In 1975, the team finished third in the season for the second time, with Raouf Ben Aziza and Hamed Kammoun scoring seven goals. The team also managed to win the Cup again by defeating El Makarem de Mahdia in the final 3–0. Which enabled the team to play the Maghreb Cup Winners Cup and win it after overcoming Union Sidi Kacem, MC Alger and SCC Mohammédia in the final, thus ending the period of training of Chetali, which lasted 5 years and the team has achieved great honours to go to train the Tunisian team.
The following years have known that the team will continue to play the same way, but this has not been rewarded for winning the trophies despite finishing the season in first place in 1976, but was defeated in a playoff against Espérance de Tunis. Ben Aziza was the top scorer with 20 goals, the team was defeated also in the semi-final of the cup against Club Africain 1–0. The Soviet coach Paramonov returned to lead the team but the team finished the season as fourth and lost to Club Africain in the final of the Cup 3–1 and Ben Aziza finished the season with 14 goals.
In 1978, the team finished third in the local championship and Raouf Ben Aziza continued his good performance finishing as the league's top scorer with 20 goals. The cup competition did not play that year because of the overcrowding of the calendar after Tunisia's qualification for the FIFA World Cup World Cup for the first time in its history in 1978 under the leadership of the son of the team Abdelmajid Chetali.

Local stability (1978–1993)

A new generation has been set up after the World Cup after the departure of international players such as Raouf Ben Aziza, who went to play in the Saudi Professional League with Al-Nassr. ES Sahel finished in the third place in the local championship and was defeated by JS Kairouan 1–0 in the Tunisian Cup in the round of 16 to leave early.
The 1980 season was similar to the previous one after finishing in the same position and went out in the cup of the same round against CS Sfaxien 1–0.
In the following season, the president Hamed Karoui left the team to devote himself to political work after 20 years as president of the team to be the longest-serving president. The club's son Mohsen Habacha was also appointed as coach of the team and despite the fact that the team reached fourth place in the league, he managed to win the Tunisian Cup after beating Stade Tunisien 3–1.
In 1982, ESS remained in the same positions and finished third in the league and went out in the quarterfinals of the Cup against CA Bizertin 2–1.
In 1983, the team came in the sixth place in the local league despite winning the Tunisian Cup after winning the final against the AS Marsa 2–1.

In 1984 the team finished third in the championship and came out of the Cup in the 16th round against CS Hammam-Lif 2–1. The following year, the team finished fourth and also lost in the cup against CS Sfaxien 2–1 in the quarter-finals.
Coach Amor Dhib, who despite his failure in the Tunisian Cup, was forced to leave in the 16th round against Espérance 2–0, but managed to restore the local league to the team's coffers after a 14-year absence. They won also the Tunisian Super Cup for the second time in their history by beating Espérance.
In 1986, the young coach Faouzi Benzarti was appointed as head coach of the team. At the age of 37, he succeeded in winning the local league for the second time in a row, in addition to the exit from the Tunisian Cup in the 16th round against CO Transports on penalties. The team also won the local Super Cup for the second time in front of the CA Bizertin. The team also participated in 1987 Arab Club Champions Cup, they passed the first round against JS Kabylie and Raja Casablanca before withdrawing in the second round defeat against the Iraqi Al-Rasheed and the Saudi Al-Ittihad.
And in the late eighties and early nineties the level of the team fell to miss the podiums and the period was also accompanied by a significant change in the number of coaches and in the management of the team which did not know the stability after the arrival of more than one president during that period, they finished in fifth place in 1988 and came out of the Cup in the semi-finals against Club Africain on penalties and in 1989 the team finished third in the league and also lost in the semifinals again against Espérance 1–0. The team also participated in the 1989 Arab Club Champions Cup, which passed the first round which includes JS Kabylie and CLAS Casablanca and reached the semi-finals after the victory over Wydad Casablanca before the defeat against Al-Hilal of Saudi Arabia.
In 1990 the team finished the season in fourth place and also suffered a spectacular defeat in the 16th round of the Tunisian Cup in front of the Océano Club de Kerkennah 3–0.
In 1991, Faouzi Benzarti returned to coach the team and finished third, and reached the final of the cup before losing to Espérance 2–1 at El Menzah Stadium. In 1992, ESS finished the season in fifth place and came out of Tunisia Cup in the semi-final against Club Africain on penalties.
The 1993 season was disastrous for the team as they came in the ninth-place, the worst position they have ever had since the Tunisian independence, and a humiliating defeat against AS Marsa 4–0 in the semi-finals of the Cup. The president of the team, Hammadi Mestiri left the team that season to succeed him the club's son Othman Jenayah in the presidency of the club.

Jenayah era: Continental brilliance (1993–2006)

After the appointment of Othman Jenayah as president of the team, Algerian coach Rabah Saâdane was hired to coach the team and improved the team's results. He reached the final of the Cup in 1994 before being defeated against AS Marsa and ended the season in second place behind Espérance. The team also participated in the 1993 Arab Cup Winners' Cup and reached the semi-final before the defeat against CO Casablanca.
In the following season, Brazilian coach José Dutra dos Santos was appointed as coach to be the first coach of South America to take the team to the third place in the domestic league before going out in the round of 16 of the cup against the Olympique Béja and returned to compete for regional competitions this year after obtaining the Maghreb Cups in the seventies as the team reached the final of the 1995 Arab Cup Winners' Cup before being defeated against fellow Club Africain at the Stade Olympique de Sousse. The team continued their good performances this year and managed to win the 1995 CAF Cup for the first time in their history to be their first continental trophy ever after their final win over AS Kaloum Star of Guinea 2–0.
The administration decided to renew confidence in the Brazilian coach. The team managed to win the Tunisian Cup 13 years later by beating JS Kairouan in the final 2–1 and the team finished second in the league. The team also reached the final of the CAF Cup in the same year before the final defeat to the Kawkab Marrakech by Away goals rule.
In the 1997 season, the team achieved outstanding results after winning the league title after 10 years despite disappointing results in the cup after the quarter-final against JS Kairouan. The team also won the 1997 African Cup Winners' Cup the same year after overcoming strong teams such as Hearts of Oak of Ghana and the Al-Mokawloon before winning the final against FAR Rabat 2–1.
The contract was terminated with the Brazilian coach after the amazing results achieved and was contracted with Croatian Ivan Buljan, who won the CAF Super Cup for the first time in its history and also achieved the third place in the league and also was defeated in the quarter-finals of the Cup to AS Marsa 2–1. The management of the team appointed Jean Fernandez, the team settled in fourth place in the national championship and came out early in the cup against ES Zarzis on penalty shootout. The player Francileudo Santos was the scorer of the Tunisian league to be the first scorer from ESS for almost 30 years.

The team then signed with coach Lotfi Benzarti to train the club who is the brother of former coach Faouzi Benzarti. Lotfi managed to win the CAF Cup in 1999 after overcoming big clubs such as Zamalek in the semi-final and Wydad Casablanca in the final. ESS continued his impressive performances in African competitions and the team reached the second place in 2000 in addition to withdrawing from the semi-finals against Club Africain. In the next season with the Serbian coach Ivica Todorov, the team won second place before being defeated in the Cup final against CS Hammam-Lif in the first match at the Stade 7 November in Radès which was opened for the 2001 Mediterranean Games. The team also reached the CAF Cup final in the same year before the defeat against JS Kabylie. In 2002, ESS won second place in the league for the third time in a row but did not play Tunisian Cup that year due to the overcrowding after Tunisia qualified for the 2002 FIFA World Cup.

In 2003, Frenchman René Lobello was named coach of the club and the team continued to win second place in the local tournament again, in addition to defeating Espérance in the quarter-final 1–0, but the team managed to win the 2003 African Cup Winners' Cup after beating the Nigerian team Julius Berger 3–0 so that ES Sahel came the most Tunisian teams winning the African titles.
The team continued to fight with the French school to appoint Bernard Simondi as coach of the club. The team took second place in the local championship to become the node of the team and they came out of the semi-finals of the cup against Espérance on penalties and also was defeated in the African Super Cup against Enyimba. The team played in the same season the 2003–04 Arab Champions League before coming out in the second round against Al Ahly SC and Ismaily SC of Egypt with difficulty.

At the end of the year, the legend Abdelmajid Chetali took charge of the team after reaching the final of the African Champions League for the first time in their history before being defeated against Enyimba in the final on penalty shootout.
In 2005, the team went out of the final round of the cup against Espérance on penalties and took second place in the tournament after equal points with CS Sfaxien before FIFA decided to settle for the latter. In July of the same year, the team signed a contract with the Bosnian coach Mehmed Baždarević who managed to reach the final of the 2005 CAF Champions League for the second time in their history and after the FAR Rabat exceeded the second round and Raja Casablanca in the semi-finals, but was defeated again in the final against Al-Ahly 3–0.
In the local Cup, the team went out against CS Hammam-Lif 2–1. Baždarević was fired by Étoile on 12 April 2006, after a 1–0 home defeat to US Monastir in their final league game which cost them the Tunisian championship with just one point behind Espérance in the league. The team signed two days later with veteran coach Faouzi Benzarti to lead the team next season.
Few weeks later, Othman Jenayah's presidency ended after 13 years in which the star was known for an unprecedented African brilliance in the history of Tunisian football.

African domination and rise to the international level (2006–2008)

Moez Driss became president on 8 June 2006 and Faouzi Benzarti was the team's coach. Benzarti was contracted with the team in order to resolve the second place node of the championship and continue to shine African and had what he wanted as the team was able to win the 2006 CAF Confederation Cup after beating his compatriot Espérance by winning at home and away and winning the Moroccan FAR Rabat in the final and is what enabled the club to play the African Super Cup against Al Ahly of Egypt but was defeated by penalties in Addis Ababa Stadium in Ethiopia. Benzarti managed to win the league title finally after finishing second in seven consecutive years despite the early exit in the Cup against CS Hammam-Lif on penalties in the quarter-finals.

In May 2007, Moez Driss announced the sudden dismissal of Faouzi Benzarti from the team's training before the start of the CAF Champions League despite excellent results.
The Frenchman Bertrand Marchand, who was the coach of Club Africain in that period was appointed. 
He succeeded in the group stage of the African competition by surpassing JS Kabylie, the Al-Ittihad and the FAR Rabat before winning the semi-final of the Al-Hilal of Sudan to qualify for the final match for the third in only 4 years and was the final with Al-Ahly, who holds the record in the number of titles and also won ESS in the 2005 final and exceeded his compatriot CS Sfaxien in 2006 to indicate all expectations for the victory of Al-Ahly sixth title, especially after the end of the first leg in Sousse with a draw 0–0.
On 9 November 2007, ES Sahel made a surprise by beating Al Ahly in Cairo 3–1 after Amine Chermiti's goal in the 90th minute in a surprise that no one expected especially in Cairo International Stadium and in front of 75,000 spectators and in front of Egyptian President Hosni Mubarak, who gave the trophy to players of the team. The legend Abdelmajid Chetali was the only one expecting the win.

The win enabled the team to qualify for the FIFA Club World Cup in Japan for the first time in their history to meet one of the best clubs in the world, like AC Milan as the European champions of 2007 and Boca Juniors also after winning the Copa Libertadores.
In the quarter-finals, the team met Pachuca of Mexico, one of the best clubs in North America, especially after winning the CONCACAF Champions League title. But the Tunisian team managed to beat it with the goal of the Ghanaian player Moussa Narry in the 85th minute to be the second African team after Al-Ahly to qualify for the semi-finals.
The team found itself against Boca Juniors in the semi-finals. ESS made a remarkable performance in the match in front of the eyes of Argentine legend Diego Maradona, who came to encourage his Argentine team. Boca Juniors narrowly won 1–0 to prevent ES Sahel from meeting AC Milan in the final.

In the third-place match, ESS tied the host and the Asian champions Urawa Red Diamonds 2–2 after the goal of Chermiti for his team before the end of the game with a quarter of an hour, but the penalty shootout led to the victory of the Japanese team. ESS ended the World Cup in fourth place in his first appearance, making his fans welcome at Monastir Habib Bourguiba International Airport.
This was one of the best periods in the history of Tunisian football because the victory of ES Sahel in the Champions League was accompanied by the victory of its compatriot CS Sfaxien with 2007 CAF Confederation Cup which made the African Super Cup with 2 Tunisian teams. This one was won by Étoile du Sahel which continued its strong performances in Africa after the win 2–1 in the Stade 7 November in Radès with the goal of Chermiti And Radhouène Felhi. After these performances, ES Sahel found itself as first in Tunisia and Africa in the IFFHS club ranking.

Locally, ES Sahel was just around the corner to maintain the league title, especially as it was the best club in Tunisia in that period before the title went to the Club Africain in the last round narrowed by just two points. Marchand announced his departure after a period full of titles and achievements so the management appointed Swiss coach Michel Decastel to lead the team.
The team reached the final of the Cup before losing to Espérance 2–1 in a game that was widely contested after the German referee Florian Meyer refused 3 correct goals for the team.
In spite of the absence of the CAF Champions League this year, ES Sahel continued their strong performances surpassing Espérance in the first round 2–0, JS Kabylie, Al-Merrikh and Asante Kotoko in the group stage to find themselves in front of their compatriot CS Sfaxien in the final to confirm the Tunisian clubs domination of the African continent. However, the title went to CS Sfaxien after a draw in Sousse 2–2 to be followed by dismissal of the coach and begin a phase of instability.

Disappointments (2008–2013)

After the continental and international glamor, the majority of that generation left the team for European clubs, with the exception of some of them like Aymen Mathlouthi, Radhouène Felhi and Afouène Gharbi. The change in the squad has affected the performance of the team despite the appointment of the German coach Gernot Rohr, but the team came in third place in the local league, which prevented ESS from participating in the African Champions League. The team came out also of the Cup of Tunisia in the quarter-finals after the defeat against Espérance 1–0 which contributed to the departure of Rohr from the team.
The former coach of US Monastir Lotfi Rhim has been appointed as coach of the team in May 2009, which witnessed the group stage of the African Champions League after overcoming ASO Chlef and Al Ahly Tripoli in the first round. 

However, ESS failed to qualify for the semi-finals after being defeated against TP Mazembe and Heartland FC as they came out from the Tunisian Cup early after the defeat against the AS Marsa on penalties. The Dutch coach Piet Hamberg also failed to emerge the team from the crisis after the early withdrawal of the 2010 CAF Confederation Cup and the third place in the league. All these disappointments contributed to the resignation of the team management and the election of a new body headed by the former player Hamed Kammoun.
Moroccan coach Mohamed Fakhir was hired to lead the team and despite the good start in the local championship, the training period did not exceed 4 months to be replaced by Mondher Kebaier who improved the results of the team and returned to compete strongly for the league title after beating Espérance 5–1 in that period and the arrival in the Cup final. However, the team lost these titles to Espérance in the end. In the African competitions and after winning the first round against Ashanti Gold, the team refused to travel to Nigeria to meet Kaduna United for security reasons, which led to the exclusion of the team from the competition.

The resignation of Hamed Kammoun from the presidency of the team in May 2011 to the emergence of a major crisis in the team affected the performance of the team which knew 4 coaches in one season which was bad for the fans of ES Sahel after the fourth position in the league in 2012. The Cup of Tunisia was not terminated because of political events in Tunisia in 2011. The team's new management, headed by Hafedh Hmaied, was unable to end the crisis in the team. Ridha Charfeddine was appointed to this post in May 2012. ESS qualified for the group stage of the 2012 CAF Champions League. The riot at Stade Olympique de Sousse on August 18, 2012, led to make a decision by the CAF to exclude them from the tournament. This contributed to the aggravation of the team's crises.

Local and continental return (2013–2019)

In February 2013, former Cameroon coach Denis Lavagne was appointed to lead the team to qualify for the playoff phase of the local championship and competed for the last round before finishing in third place. In fact, ESS was champions in the first half of the last round. And despite the team exceeded JSM Béjaïa in the first round, the team failed to qualify for the semi-finals of the 2013 CAF Confederation Cup after losing to CS Sfaxien and Stade Malien. As for the 2012 Tunisian Cup, which was completed in 2013, ES Sahel managed to win it after beating CS Sfaxien 1–0 to be the first trophy they have won in the last five years.

In December 2013, veteran Frenchman Roger Lemerre was hired to lead the team. He formed a number of players and succeeded in making successful assignments such as the Algerian Baghdad Bounedjah who finished the season as a goal for the local league despite finishing third in the league. He also managed to win the 2014 Tunisian Cup for the second time in the final after beating CS Sfaxien in the final with a last-minute goal of Bounedjah. After the end of his contract, Lemerre left the team with good impressions on the formation of an integrated team. The team signed with Serbian Dragan Cvetković, who did not stay in office more than a month after the catastrophic results of the 2014 CAF Confederation Cup by finishing last in the group to be replaced by coach Faouzi Benzarti.

The team finished the season in second place of the local championship after an arbitration dispute led to the refusal of the team management to play the game of CS Hammam-Lif. However, the team managed to win the local cup after beating Stade Gabèsien 4–3 in the final to win the trophy for the third time. As for the continent, the team played in the 2015 CAF Confederation Cup, surpassing Moroccan Raja Casablanca in the first round as they qualified for the semi-finals after passing Stade Malien and its compatriot Espérance and winning Al Ahly of Egypt and then beat Zamalek in the semi-finals in a historic match 5–1 for ESS before going beyond Orlando Pirates in the final to win the first African title since 2008 dedicated to his return to Africa and become the most capped CAF Cup team with 4 titles.

This African title win allowed ESS to play in the 2016 CAF Super Cup against TP Mazembe, but the team narrowly lost 2–1. Locally, the team managed to win the league after nine years to collect 77 points, breaking the Tunisian league record. The team was eliminated from the quarterfinals of the Cup after a defeat against Espérance 1–0 and in the same year the team was unable to qualify for the group stage from the African Champions League after defeating Enyimba narrowly 4–3 to qualify for the 2016 CAF Confederation Cup, which was close to the maintenance of the title after the qualification the semi-final, surpassing in the Group FUS Rabat, Kawkab Marrakech and Al Ahly of Tripoli before coming out in front of TP Mazembe in the semi-finals. After nearly three years at the helm of the team, Faouzi Benzarti and the team management were separated for financial reasons to go to Espérance de Tunis.

The team's managing director appointed the former coach of TP Mazembe, Hubert Velud to coach the team, leaving the quarter-finals of the Cup against CS Hammam-Lif on penalties before coming in second place in the league after competing with Espérance in the last round. Continentally, The team managed to move beyond the group stage of the African Champions League, bypassing the two teams of Sudan: Al-Hilal and Al-Merrikh, and to beat Al Ahli Tripoli in the quarter-finals 2–0 to qualify for the semi-finals of the tournament for the first time in 10 years where they won the competition. But ESS lost to Al-Ahly 7–3 to get out of the competition and the dismissal of the French coach Velud. Most of the members of the administration, such as Ziad Jaziri and Hussein Jenayah, resigned.

With the arrival of Algerian coach Kheïreddine Madoui, the team reached the final of the Tunisian Cup before losing to the Club Africain 4–1 in addition to the end of the season in third place despite the equal points with Club Africain before the deduction is based on direct confrontations. After that, Chiheb Ellili was hired but he did not stay much after the Champions League exit to Espérance in the quarterfinals with difficulty. The Belgian coach Georges Leekens did not survive because of the unconfirmed results in the Tunisian league.
Roger Lemerre was relegated by the management, improving the team's results to finish second in the league, just two points from the top, and managed to reach the final of Tunisia Cup. Outside of Tunisia, the team managed to qualify for the semi-finals of the 2019 CAF Confederation Cup after beating Al-Hilal of Sudan before they struggled out against Zamalek. In addition, the team succeeded in winning the Arab Club Champions Cup for the first time in its history after beating Al-Ramtha of Jordan in the first round, and the two Moroccan clubs of Casablanca: Wydad and Raja, then Al-Merrikh of Sudan in the semi-final before winning the final in Hazza bin Zayed Stadium at Al Ain in UAE, after beating Al-Hilal of Saudi Arabia 2–1 to win $6 million.

Decline and away from the stadium (2019–present)
The 2–0 victory over Club Africain in June 2019 was the last match held at the Stade Olympique de Sousse before its closure and the launch of its expansion, which coincided with the team's decline in results.

Rivalries
The Tunisian classico is a football match between Étoile Sportive du Sahel and the other major Tunisian clubs: Espérance Sportive de Tunis (EST), Club Africain (CA) and Club Sportif Sfaxien (CSS).
This denomination is inspired by the Spanish El Clásico between Real Madrid and FC Barcelona.

In terms of location, ESS are quite an isolated club, so games against US Monastir, ES Hammam-Sousse (just north of Sousse) and CS M'saken are considered local derbies.

Étoile Sportive du Sahel – Espérance Sportive de Tunis
The two teams met for the first time in the league during the 1944–1945 criterium; their first match ended in a draw 0–0. They met regularly from 1946 to 1947, after the unification of the north and south Championships, except in 1961–1962 when the Etoile Sportive du Sahel was dissolved.

Before independence, the two teams met only 16 times, Espérance won 7 of them and Étoile in 5 matches while the teams tied on 4 occasions. Espérance scored 22 goals while Étoile scored 20 goals

In the national championship, which was founded after independence, the statistics are very close. Espérance won 46 games and Étoile in 38, while 42 games ended with a draw and Espérance scored 130 goals while ESS scored 117 goals.

In the Tunisian Cup, despite winning Espérance in 12 games and ESS won in 11 and tied in 3, but Étoile Sportive du Sahel scored 27 goals while Espérance scored 25 goals.

But in the African competitions, both in the CAF Champions League and the CAF Confederation Cup, the cusp tends in the caf confederation league to ESS who won 5 games while Espérance won 4 matches in the caf champions league and the teams tied in 3 of them.

Étoile Sportive du Sahel – Club Africain
In the national championship, which was founded in 1956, Club Africain won 45 games and Étoile du Sahel in 42, while 38 games ended with a draw and Club Africain scored 129 goals while ESS scored 124 goals.

In the Tunisian Cup, despite winning Étoile Sportive du Sahel in 10 games and CA won in only 7 and tied in 3, but Club Africain scored 21 goals while ES Sahel scored 20 goals.

In the Tunisian Super Cup, there is just one match between the teams with a large victory for ESS which won 5–2.

Outside of Tunisia, the two teams met in one match in the Arab cup final, which ended in favour of CA in the extra time.

Étoile Sportive du Sahel – Club Sportif Sfaxien
The two teams met for the first time in the league in December 1955; their first match ended for CS Sfaxien 3–1. They met regularly from 1946 to 1947, the reunion season for the North and South Championships, except in  except in 1961–1962 when the Etoile Sportive du Sahel was dissolved.

In the national championship, which was founded in 1956, Étoile du Sahel won 54 games and Club Sfaxien in 31, while 43 games ended with a draw and ESS scored 154 goals while CSS scored 116 goals.

In the Tunisian Cup, Étoile du Sahel won in 3 games and Club Sfaxien in 2, while 2 games ended with a draw.

But in the African competitions, both in the CAF Cup and the CAF Confederation Cup, the cusp tends to CSS who won 3 games while Espérance won 1 match and the teams tied in 4 of them.

Honours and achievements
Étoile Sportive du Sahel was the first African club to have won all official club competitions recognized by the Confederation of African Football.

National competitions 
 Tunisian Ligue Professionnelle 1
 Winners (10): 1949–50, 1957–58, 1962–63, 1965–66, 1971–72, 1985–86, 1986–87, 1996–97, 2006–07, 2015–16

 Tunisian Cup
 Winners (10): 1958–59, 1962–63, 1973–74, 1974–75, 1980–81, 1982–83, 1995–96, 2011–12, 2013–14, 2014–15

 Tunisian League Cup
 Winners: 2004–05

 Tunisian Super Cup
 Winners (3): 1973, 1986, 1987

International competitions 
 FIFA Club World Cup
 Fourth Place: 2007

African competitions 

 CAF Champions League
 Winners: 2007

 CAF Confederation Cup
 Winners (2):2006, 2015

 African Cup Winners' Cup
 Winners (2): 1997, 2003

 CAF Cup
 Winners (2): 1995, 1999

 CAF Super Cup
 Winners (2):1998 , 2008

Regional competitions 
 Arab Club Champions Cup
 Winners: 2018–19

 Maghreb Champions Cup
 Winners: 1972

 Maghreb Cup Winners' Cup
 Winners: 1975

Statistics

African competitions

National competitions

Individual honours

Top Scorers

Tunisian Golden Boot

African Competitions Golden Boot

Arab Golden Boot

IFFHS rankings

Club world ranking
Footballdatabase club's points 2 August 2020.

CAF club rankings
Footballdatabase club's points 2 August 2020.

National club rankings
Footballdatabase club's points 2 August 2020.

CAF rankings

Personnel

Management

Coaching Staff

Players

Current squad

Out on loan

Managers

Notes:
  Suspended in 2012 and resumed in 2013.

Presidents
Since its creation, Hamed Karoui remains the one who was the longest president of the club (twenty years from 1961 to 1981). In July 2007, the former player of the club, Othman Jenayah, was named honorary president.

Home stadium

The home stadium of Étoile du Sahel is the Olympic Stadium of Sousse which is a multi-purpose stadium in Sousse that was inaugurated in 1973. For many decades, Sousse footballers knew only the clay surfaces and knew the turf surfaces only when the stadium was inaugurated with an initial capacity of 10,000 places. It passes over the years to 15,000 seats and is then expanded again on the occasion of the 1994 African Cup of Nations with 6,000 additional seats to reach a capacity of 21,000 seats; A luminous panel is installed at the same time. Another expansion was carried out in 1999 to bring the capacity of the stadium to 28,000 seats for the 2001 Mediterranean Games, a reorganization of the gallery of honor was carried out, from a capacity of 70 to 217 places. It hosted 1977 FIFA World Youth Championship, 1994 African Cup of Nations, 2001 Mediterranean Games and 2004 African Cup of Nations.

In November 2017, on a visit to the President of the Republic, Beji Caid Essebsi, to Sousse, he gave an indication of the beginning of the expansion of the stadium and thus in March 2019, the inauguration ceremony of the beginning of works of the Stadium was attended by the Minister of Youth and Sports, Sonia Ben Cheikh, in order to be able to accommodate 40,000 spectators instead of the current capacity.

The cost of completing the total works was estimated initially at 32 million dinars, including 4 million dinars as a contribution from the Municipality of Sousse and 2 million dinars from the contribution of the team and coastal and is expected to include the expansion of the stadium, which was expected to extend for 27 months, especially covered runways and open runways in the east and north and south will also include works. The rehabilitation of the wardrooms, the rehabilitation of the health units for the public, the creation of 22 cells and the complete restoration of electricity networks.
The Municipality of Sousse decided to enable the team to play local matches at the Stade Municipal Bou Ali-Lahouar in Hammam Sousse in the next two seasons until the completion of the work in the team's stronghold. The Hammam Sousse stadium hosted the 1965 African Cup of Nations and can accommodate 6,500 spectators while the continental 
matches will be played in Stade 7 November in Radès, biggest stadium of Tunisia. Finally, the works of extension finished at the end of April, 2022 and the first game of the team back in its new 40,000-seater stadium was held on the 4th of May, 2022 against Club Sportif Sfaxien.

Youth Training Center

Taking the example of the European clubs, and in the interest of professionalism, Étoile Sportive du Sahel has a forming and training center for players located in Sousse. It consists of six football fields including two synthetic, a restaurant, a weight room, a 3-star hotel called "Star's Sport Residence" and a thalassotherapy center.

The center allowed the club to export talents to Europe, like Amine Chermiti (transferred to Hertha BSC in 2008), Yassine Chikhaoui (transferred to FC Zürich in 2006), Chaker Zouaghi, Mohamed Ali Nafkha, Ammar Jemal, Karim Haggui, Aymen Abdennour, Zoubeir Baya, Hamdi Nagguez, and Mohamed Amine Ben Amor and many other players, and especially allowed him to be constantly competitive to win local or continental titles.

The youth training center of ES Sahel is one of the important tributaries of the team and the elite of Tunisian football in general with distinguished elements who have received a modern composition with professional technical specifications. Most analysts say it is the best in Tunisia.

The management of ESS always chooses qualified coaches to oversee the youth training center like Belgian coach Christophe Dessy, or Frenchman Jean-Luc Ruty and Philippe Goubet. The strategy recently taken is focused by reducing the number of players to 20 players in each category to ensure greater efficiency in training and to create a new kind of players who can emerge in the future.

The youth training center is hosting 8 types of young football talent active in national and regional championships. Each category includes 20 players and 3 goalkeepers, adding that each category includes a coach, an assistant coach, a goalkeeping coach, a physical coach and a doctor.

In the framework of external cooperation and the efforts of the youth training center to establish a tradition of exchanging experiences with the best youth training centers in the world, ESS Sahel hosted Aspire Academy to participate in a friendly tournament organized by ESS.
Qatar's Aspire Academy has hosted five categories of ESS Youth Center, where the players of the team have showed the best impressions, both on the sporting level, with three or five categories on the team, for what they have shown professionally.
The youth team also had good results in Al Kass International Cup, where they managed to beat Bayern Munich 3–2, supervised by Miroslav Klose in addition to getting a respectable ranking in the tournament.

Colors and logos
The Étoile Sportive du Sahel has opted from its origin for the colors red and white of the flag of Tunisia. At home, the player wears a red jersey with a five-pointed white star, white shorts and red socks. Outside of Sousse, the player wears a white jersey with a five-pointed red star, red shorts and white socks, or also in blue kits.

Supporters
Several groups take care of the shows preceding the matches or the beginning of the second half, commonly called dakhla. Brigade Rouge, created in 2001, is a group of supporters belonging to the barra brava movement.

Two sources of funding allow the club to survive: sales of by-products (t-shirts, caps, sweaters, scarves, albums, etc.), donations from powerful businessmen and fans.
Other groups appeared such as Fanatics in 2003, Saheliano in April 2007, Hools Squad and Red Fans in 2009 or No Fear in 2010.

Kit suppliers and shirt sponsors

Notes

External links

  
 Official Instagram Page

 
Football clubs in Tunisia
Association football clubs established in 1925
Multi-sport clubs in Tunisia
1925 establishments in Tunisia
Sports clubs in Tunisia
CAF Champions League winning clubs
CAF Cup winning clubs
CAF Confederation Cup winning clubs
African Cup Winners Cup winning clubs
CAF Super Cup winning clubs